Duradundi  is a village in the southern state of Karnataka, India. It is located in the Gokak taluk of Belagavi district in Karnataka.

Demographics
 India census, Duradundi had a population of 7271 with 3675 males and 3596 females.

See also
 Belgaum
 Districts of Karnataka

References

External links
 http://Belgaum.nic.in/

Villages in Belagavi district